Frea vermiculata is a species of beetle in the family Cerambycidae. It was described by Kolbe in 1894.

References

vermiculata
Beetles described in 1894